Frank Neubarth (born 29 July 1962) is a German football manager and former player who spent his whole career with SV Werder Bremen and has since managed FC Schalke 04, Holstein Kiel and FC Carl Zeiss Jena.

Playing career
Neubarth was born in Hamburg. A forward, he played for Werder Bremen from 1982 until 1996 and scored 97 goals in 317 Bundesliga matches. He also scored 25 goals in the DFB-Pokal and 13 goals in European competitions. He scored at least once every season, except the 1986–87 campaign when he was injured mostly and played just five matches. The most goals he ever scored in a single season was 20 during the 1985–86 season in which Bremen finished in third place. Throughout the course of his career, he won the DFB-Pokal in 1991 and in 1994, and the UEFA Cup Winners' Cup in 1992. In 1988 and 1993, he helped Bremen win the league title. He earned his only cap for the West German national team on 2 April 1988.

Coaching career
After his retirement from playing, Neubarth went into coaching and worked with Werder Bremen's reserve team from 1 July 1999 until 7 January 2002. On 1 July 2002, he succeeded Huub Stevens as head coach of Schalke 04 where he was in charge for less than 10 months. Then, in July 2004, he was appointed as head coach of Holstein Kiel. He remained at Holstein until 2 October 2006. On 11 April 2007, he was unveiled as Heiko Weber's successor at Carl Zeiss Jena. He took over with just six games of the 2006–07 season remaining and helped the club maintain an unbeaten record until the end of the campaign and avoid relegation to the Second Division. However, after a poor start to the 2007–08 season, he was sacked after just five games, on 20 September 2007.

Coaching record

Honours
Werder Bremen
 UEFA Cup Winners' Cup: 1991–92
 Bundesliga: 1987–88, 1992–93
 DFB-Pokal: 1990–91, 1993–94

References

External links
 
 
 

Living people
1962 births
Footballers from Hamburg
Association football forwards
German footballers
Germany international footballers
Germany under-21 international footballers
Bundesliga players
SC Concordia von 1907 players
SV Werder Bremen players
German football managers
FC Schalke 04 managers
FC Carl Zeiss Jena managers
Holstein Kiel managers
SV Werder Bremen II managers
West German footballers